The events of 1995 in anime.

Accolades  
At the Mainichi Film Awards, Junkers Come Here won the Animation Film Award and Memories won the Ōfuji Noburō Award. Internationally, Pom Poko won the award for best feature film at the Annecy International Animated Film Festival.

Releases

Deaths

March
 March 19: Yasuo Yamada, Japanese voice actor (voice of Arsene Lupin III on Lupin III), dies at age 62.

See also
1995 in animation

External links 
Japanese animated works of the year, listed in the IMDb

Anime
Anime
Years in anime

{{educational assignment}}